Heckle was a melodic hardcore/punk rock band from New Jersey, United States.

The band was formed in the summer of 1994 by guitarist Steve Cunningham, bass player Chris Whalen, guitarist Eric Arikian and vocalist Chris Baglieri, Heckle (briefly named "Lick") found original drummer Tim Caspare to complete the group. The band then released a split single in January 1996 with AFI, followed in the spring of 1996 by a full-length LP on Wingnut Records entitled We're Not Laughing With You. After a nationwide summer tour, the band parted ways with their original drummer. The position was then filled by Todd Hennig who was the drummer for the Vermont hardcore band SevenYearsWar, which Steve had once played guitar for. After another East Coast tour, Heckle was signed by Hopeless Records and recorded their second and final album with Donnell Cameron at Westbeach Recorders in Hollywood, California The Complicated Futility of Ignorance. Henning and Miner later joined Death by Stereo. Arikian and Whalen featured in the group Let's Be Loveless.

Members 
Original lineup:
 Eric Arikian - guitar
 Christopher Baglieri - vocals (1994–1995)
 Steve Cunningham - guitar, vocals
 Chris Whalen - bass
 Tim Caspare - drums (1994–1996)
Later members:
 Todd Hennig - drums (1996–1997)
 Jim Miner - guitar (1997)

Discography 
 AFI/Heckle split 7-inch single (Wingnut Records, 1996) – with AFI
 We're Not Laughing With You CD/LP (Wingnut Records, 1996)
 Jughead's Revenge/Heckle split 7-inch single with Jughead's Revenge (Hopeless Records, 1997)
 The Complicated Futility of Ignorance CD/LP (Hopeless Records, 1997)
 The Motive Power of Fire EP (2021)
Compilation Appearances:
 Punk Fiction song "D-Day" CD (Wedge Records, 1997)
 From the Ground Up song "Safety Net" (Eyeball Records, 1996)
 Hopelessly Devoted to You, Too song "Joke's on Me" (Hopeless Records, 1998)
 Take Action! song "Little Engine" (Sub City Records, 1999)
 Hopelessly Devoted to You Vol. 3 song "Along For The Ride" (Hopeless Records, 2000)

References

Musical groups established in 1994
Musical groups from New Jersey
Hardcore punk groups from New Jersey
Hopeless Records artists
1994 establishments in New Jersey